The Azadegan Organization was an Iranian monarchist organisation which sought to restore the Pahlavi dynasty following the 1979 Iranian Revolution. The group, founded by General Bahram Aryana, was described as the most prominent of the "fundamentalist monarchist" (vice "constitutionalist monarchist") groups following the Revolution.

Hijack of Iranian naval vessel

References

External links
 

Monarchist organizations
Counter-revolutionaries
Organisations of the Iranian Revolution
Monarchism in Iran